The 1660s decade ran from 1 January 1660, to 31 December 1669.

References

Sources